Stargard (1945: Starogród, 1950–2016: Stargard Szczeciński; formerly German: Stargard in Pommern, or Stargard an der Ihna) is a city in northwestern Poland, located in the West Pomeranian Voivodeship. In 2021 it was inhabited by 67,293 people. It is situated on the Ina River. The city is the seat of the Stargard County, and, extraterritorially, of the municipality of Stargard. It is the second biggest city of Szczecin agglomeration. Stargard is a major railroad junction, where the southwards connection from Szczecin splits into two directions: towards Poznań and Gdańsk.

Etymology 
The city's name is of Pomeranian (Kashubian) origin and stands for old (stari) town/city (gard or gôrd).

In this meaning, the term gard is still being used by the only surviving Pomeranian language speakers, the Kashubs. However, some experts say that the name is of proto-Norse origin: starn (star) and gate (as in English).

History

Middle Ages

The settlement was founded in the 8th century at the site of the present-day district of Osetno near downtown Stargard. In 967 it became part of the emerging Polish state under the first Polish rulers from the Piast dynasty. Stargard was first mentioned in 1124, when it was part of Poland under Bolesław III Wrymouth, and received Magdeburg city rights in 1243 from Barnim I, Duke of Pomerania.

It was one of the most important towns and a major trade centre of the Duchy of Pomerania, after it split off from Poland as a result of the 12th-century fragmentation of Poland. From 1283, the city had a port at the mouth of the Ina River in the nowadays abandoned village of Inoujście. Defensive city walls were built in the 13th century and expanded in the 14th, 15th and early 16th centuries. In 1363 the city joined the Hanseatic League.

As a result of the ongoing fragmentation of Pomerania, in 1368 Stargard became part of the Duchy of Słupsk (Pomerania-Stolp) and in 1377 it became the capital of a separate eponymous duchy, which in 1403 fell back to Duchy of Słupsk, a vassal state of the Kingdom of Poland. In 1478 Stargard became part of the reunified Duchy of Pomerania.

In the meantime, the trade rivalry with the nearby city of Szczecin led to the outbreak of the Stargard-Szczecin war in 1454, which ended in 1464. In 1477 Stargard helped Duke Wartislaw X recapture the town of Gartz during a Brandenburgian invasion.

Modern period

Stargard was part of the Duchy of Pomerania until its dissolution after the death of the last duke Bogislaw XIV in 1637. During the Thirty Years' War the city was captured by Sweden in 1630. It was besieged by the troops of the Holy Roman Empire in 1635, and in order to hamper the attacks the Swedish commander set fire to the suburbs, causing a city fire, however, it was still captured by imperial troops. In 1636 it was recaptured by the Swedes, then it was taken and plundered by Imperial troops to fall back to the Swedes again after the Battle of Wittstock. In 1637 it was again captured by Imperial troops and then by Sweden. As a result of the war, the population decreased by about 75%.

In accordance to the 1648 Peace of Westphalia, in 1653 it was incorporated, together with the rest of East Pomerania, into Brandenburg-Prussia. In 1701 Stargard became part of the Kingdom of Prussia and in 1818, after the Napoleonic Wars, Stargard became part of the new district Szadzko (then officially Saatzig) within the Province of Pomerania. During the Franco-Prussian War (1870–1871), the Prussians established a prisoner-of-war camp for French troops in the city.

As a result of the unification of Germany in 1871 the city became part of the German Empire. On 1 April 1901 it became an independent city, separate from the Saatzig District. According to the Prussian census of 1905, Stargard had a population of 26,907, of which 97% were Germans and 3% were Poles. In interwar Germany, the town was the site of a concentration camp for unwanted Jewish immigrants from Eastern Europe. In the March 1933 German federal election the Nazi Party received 58.7% of the vote in the city.

World War II

In 1939, during the German invasion of Poland, which started World War II, the Germans established the Dulag L temporary camp for Polish (including Kashubian) prisoners of war and civilians near Stargard, which in October 1939 was transformed into the large prisoner-of-war camp Stalag II-D. Then, after the battle of France in 1940, also the French, the Dutch and Belgians were held there, from 1941 also Yugoslavian and Soviet POWs, from 1942 also thousands of Canadians captured at Dieppe, one of whom was Gerald MacIntosh Johnston, a Canadian actor, who was killed trying to escape, and after 1943 also Italians. The POWs were subjected to racial segregation, and Poles, Africans, Arabs, Jews and Soviet troops were separated from POWs of other nationalities and subjected to worse treatment. Serbs also faced more severe treatment.

There was also a subcamp of the Ravensbrück concentration camp in the city, as well as seven forced labour camps.

In February 1945, one of the last German armoured offensives, Operation Solstice, was launched from the Stargard area. The local population was evacuated by the Germans on the order of Heinrich Himmler before the approaching Soviets in the final stages of the war.

As a result of World War II the town again became part of Poland, under territorial changes demanded by the Soviet Union at the Potsdam Conference. Polish local administration was appointed on March 23, 1945. The town was repopulated by Poles, some of whom were displaced from former eastern Poland annexed by the Soviet Union.

Post-war period
In 1950 the city was renamed Stargard Szczeciński by adding the adjective Szczeciński after the nearby city of Szczecin to distinguish it from Starogard Gdański in Gdańsk Pomerania. In 1961 the city limits were expanded by including the settlement of Kluczewo as a new district.

In 1979 the city suffered a flood.

In 1993 the city celebrated the 750th anniversary of receiving city rights.

In 2004 a north-western part of the town was made into an industrial park - Stargardzki Park Przemysłowy. Another industrial park is located in the south - Park Przemysłowy Wysokich Technologii.

On January 1, 2016, the town was renamed Stargard.

Landmarks and monuments

Heavy bombing during World War II devastated most of Stargard's fine historical sites and destroyed over 75% of the city. Some of these monuments, such as St. Mary's Church (13th–15th centuries) and the 16th-century town hall, have been rebuilt. The newly restored buildings are on the European Route of Brick Gothic. Some of the notable surviving examples include:

 St. Mary's Church, a distinctive Brick Gothic landmark of the city, dating back to the 15th century, one of the largest brick churches in Europe, listed as a Historic Monument of Poland
 St. John's Church from the 15th century
 Medieval fortifications, including ramparts, walls, gates and towers, also listed as a Historic Monument of Poland, prime examples:
 Brama Młyńska (The Mill Gate) from the 15th century, the only Polish water gate still in existence and one of two in Europe
 Wałowa Gate from the 15th century
 Pyrzycka Gate from the 13th century
 Red Sea Tower (Baszta Morze Czerwone) from 1513
 Weavers' Tower (Baszta Tkaczy) from the 15th century
 White Head Tower (Baszta Białogłówka) from the 15th century
 Renaissance town hall, that has been known as one of the most remarkable examples of 16th-century central European architecture
 Gothic tenement houses
 Gothic Arsenal (Arsenał)

Other sites include:
 Granary (16th century)
 The largest conciliation cross in Europe (1542)
 Bolesław I the Brave Park (Park im. Bolesława Chrobrego), the oldest and largest park in Stargard
 Jagiellonian Park (Park Jagielloński)
 Baroque guardhouse at the marketplace, now housing a museum
 Panorama Park with the Panorama Palace
 Holy Spirit church
 Church of the Transfiguration
 War cemetery where about 5,000 soldiers of various nationalities were buried during World War I and II: Polish, French, Serbian/Yugoslav, Russian/Soviet, Italian, Romanian, Belgian, British, Moroccan, Portuguese and Dutch
 The 15th Meridian Monument (Pomnik 15. Południk)
 Monument to the Victims of Siberia and Katyn
 Monuments of the Polish bards Adam Mickiewicz and Juliusz Słowacki
 Red Barracks (Czerwone Koszary), the largest military barracks in Pomerania

Sport

The city is home to Spójnia Stargard, a men's basketball team, which competes in the Polish Basketball League (the country's top division), 1997 runners-up, and Błękitni Stargard, formerly a multi-sports club, now a men's association football team, best known for reaching the Polish Cup semi-final in 2015.

Demographics

Notable people

Karl August Ferdinand von Borcke (1776–1830), Prussian general
Carl Wilhelm Schmidt (died 1864), missionary
Oscar Levy (1867–1946), writer
Max Levy (1869-1932), electro-engineer
Werner von Blomberg (1878–1946), general
Georg Joachimsthal (1863–1914), orthopedist
Hasso von Wedel (1898–1961) Wehrmacht General 
Hans-Joachim von Merkatz (1905–1982) Federal Minister of Justice 1956–1957
Claus Biederstaedt (1928-2020), actor
Peter Karow (born 1940), entrepreneur
 Carlo von Tiedemann (born 1943), television presenter
Arkadiusz Bąk (born 1974), footballer
Ewa Kasprzyk (born 1957), actress
Margaret (born 1991), singer-songwriter

International relations

Twin towns — sister cities
Stargard is twinned with:

In Fiction
In The Cross Time Engineer science fiction series of novels the main character falsely claims Stargard origin to conceal he is a time traveler.

Notes

References

External links

 Official Website - some materials available in English and German
 Archaeology and history museum
 Satellite photo via Google Maps

Cities and towns in West Pomeranian Voivodeship
Stargard County
Populated places established in the 8th century